Woodling Gymnasium is a gym on the campus of Cleveland State University in Cleveland, Ohio. It opened in 1973. One of its facilities is a 3,000 seat multi-purpose arena that was home to the Cleveland State Vikings basketball team until the Wolstein Center opened in 1991. It is named after former Fenn College and Cleveland State University coach and athletic director Homer E. Woodling. It was dedicated on October 20, 1973.

References

External links
Venue information

Basketball venues in Ohio
Defunct college basketball venues in the United States
Cleveland State Vikings basketball
College volleyball venues in the United States
College wrestling venues in the United States
Indoor arenas in Ohio
Sports venues in Cleveland
Wrestling venues in Ohio
Sports venues completed in 1973